Dendrobium cerinum is a species of orchid that is endemic to the island of Luzon in the Philippines. It was first formally described in 1879 by Heinrich Gustav Reichenbach in The Gardeners' Chronicle. The specific epithet cerinum is derived from the Ancient Greek word  meaning "waxen", "wax-colored" or "yellowish".

References

cerinum
Orchids of the Philippines
Plants described in 1879
Taxa named by Heinrich Gustav Reichenbach